Edward Lake (1835 – 25 February 1908) was a 19th-century independent conservative Member of Parliament in the Waikato region of New Zealand.

Lake was born in Kent, England. He came to New Zealand in 1875.
 

Lake died on 25 February 1908 at Onehunga.

References

1835 births
1908 deaths
Members of the New Zealand House of Representatives
New Zealand MPs for North Island electorates
19th-century New Zealand politicians